The United States Penitentiary, Atwater (USP Atwater) is a high-security United States federal prison for male inmates in unincorporated Merced County, California. The institution also includes a minimum-security satellite camp. It is operated by the Federal Bureau of Prisons, a division of the United States Department of Justice.

USP Atwater is located on land formerly part of Castle Air Force Base. It is near the city of Atwater in Merced County, California, 130 miles from San Francisco.

Facility and programs

USP Atwater offers various educational programs, including mandatory GED classes for inmates without high school diplomas, occupational and vocational training with apprenticeships, adult continuing education, parenting classes and leisure programs.

Notable incidents

Murder of Correction Officer Jose Rivera
On June 20, 2008, as Federal Correction Officer Jose Rivera (22-year old Navy veteran) was conducting his daily count on the second floor, inmate Joseph Cabrera Sablan attacked Officer Rivera with an eight-inch self-made knife or shank.  Outnumbered, Officer Rivera attempted to seek assistance, but was knocked backwards by Sablan and tackled by inmate James Ninete Leon Guerrero.  Both inmates had been previously convicted of murder and were serving life sentences.  As Officer Rivera was seeking assistance from the first floor, he tripped on the stairs and was held down by Guerrero as Sablan stabbed him in excess of 20 times. Despite his injuries, Officer Rivera was able to restrain both inmates until additional officers arrived. Officer Rivera was transported to a local hospital, but died shortly afterward.

The Federal Bureau of Investigation investigated the incident, and Sablan and Guerrero were indicted for the murder of Officer Rivera on August 14, 2008.

On May 30, 2014, Guerrero was sentenced to life in prison without the possibility of release. Guerrero was sentenced by U.S. District Judge Phillip Pro of the District of Nevada.

On September 29, 2015, Sablan was sentenced to life in prison without the possibility of release.

Inmate murder
On August 2, 2006, Juwan Ferguson and the victim, Domosanies Slaughter, were cellmates in the Special Housing Unit at USP Atwater. Ferguson, a repeat felon with a lengthy criminal history, told several correctional officers at different times during that day that he wanted Slaughter removed from his cell. After he repeated this request to another officer, Slaughter hit Ferguson in the face. Ferguson responded by beating Slaughter into unconsciousness and then continuing to beat him even after he was unconscious.
Correctional officers observed Ferguson drag Slaughter out from underneath one of the beds in the cell. Ignoring orders to stop, Ferguson continued to strike Slaughter's head against the concrete floor and kick the back of his head until he was restrained. Slaughter was transported to an area hospital, where he died on August 8, 2006.

In July 2009, Ferguson was convicted of voluntary manslaughter and was subsequently sentenced to life in prison. Ferguson's sentence was overturned on appeal and he was resentenced to 96 months in prison in 2011. Ferguson served his sentence at Florence ADX, the federal supermax prison in Colorado, and was released in 2018.

John Balazs, the attorney who defended Ferguson, argued that the Federal Bureau of Prisons was partially at fault for Slaughter's death, mainly because Slaughter had been diagnosed with schizophrenia and USP Atwater was not properly equipped to address Slaughter's condition. In addition, Ferguson had asked corrections officials to move Slaughter out of his cell and Ferguson did not start the fight.

Notable inmates (current and former)
†The Sentencing Reform Act of 1984 eliminated parole for federal inmates. However, inmates sentenced for offenses committed prior to 1987 are eligible for parole consideration.

See also 
 List of U.S. federal prisons
 Federal Bureau of Prisons
 Incarceration in the United States

References

External links
 USP Atwater

Atwater
Buildings and structures in Merced County, California
Atwater
2001 establishments in California